False coral snake may refer to:

 Anilius, a genus of snakes, and its single species Anilius scytale
 Erythrolamprus, a genus of snakes in the family Colubridae
 Oxyrhopus, a genus of snakes in the family Colubridae
 Erythrolamprus pseudocorallus, a species of snake in the family Colubridae

Animal common name disambiguation pages